Leonel Cárdenas, also known as Leonel Cárdenas Mora, also spelled Cárdenas (born 8 February 2000 in Tlalnepantla de Baz) is a Mexican professional squash player. As of February 2018, he was ranked number 145 in the world. In 2017 he won the Country Club Cochabamba Bolivia Open professional PSA tournament.

References

2000 births
Living people
Mexican male squash players
21st-century Mexican people